The Portuguese national cricket team is the team that represents the country of Portugal in international cricket.

History

Beginnings 
Cricket in Portugal dates back to the Peninsular War of 1809–1814, when English troops were encamped in Lisbon. A game between sides from Porto and Lisbon has been played almost every year since 1861. English club teams paid frequent visits; the Cryptics Cricket Club toured eight times between 1924 and 1939. The game was confined, however, to the expatriate community, particularly the port wine manufacturers of Porto, until events in 1974 gave Portuguese cricket an unexpected boost.

Playing numbers increase 
The Carnation Revolution led to many Portuguese citizens returning from their former overseas province of Goa, and the subsequent independence of Mozambique brought many Portuguese citizens back, bringing cricket with them. Other Portuguese citizens living in Portugal's former African overseas provinces moved to Rhodesia and South Africa, where their children were absorbed into the sporting cultures of those countries, and the subsequent socio-political changes there led to them bringing their love of cricket back to Portugal.

International competition 
The Cricket Association of Portugal was founded in 1994 and they became an ICC member two years later. Their first international engagement was in the European Nations Cup in Switzerland in 1997, where they reached the semi finals. They competed in that tournament's successor, the ECC Trophy in 1999, finishing as runners up and qualifying for Division Two of the European Championship in 2000. They finished fourth in that tournament.

They again played in the ECC Trophy in 2001, this time winning the tournament, again qualifying for Division Two of the European Championship in 2002. They finished third and then played in the ECC Trophy in 2003. This time their performances from the previous two tournaments did not continue and they finished in 5th place, a performance they repeated in the European Affiliates Championship in 2005. They will compete in Division Three of the European Championships in 2007.

1st tournament ( The European Nations Cup 1997 ) 
In 1997 Portugal played their first tournament. It was the European Nations Cup 1997. They also played their first match in that tournament. Their first match was against Greece at Lyceum Alpinum, Zuoz, Switzerland 19 August 1997. In that match Portugal made a 381/3 batting first and their players TG Rankine and Intesab Mehdi has scored two fine innings of 173 and 81*. After Portugal's innings Greece came down to bat. But for the bashing bowling of Portugal's bowlers Greece was all out at 115 in 29 overs. Santilal made the best bowling figure (3/27 in 6 overs) in Portugal's innings. Portugal won that match by 266 runs.
In their second match on 20 August 1997 against Malta at the same stadium Portugal batted first. They scored 297/9. Opener Nadeem Butt scored a wonderful 96 run innings. Again the bowlers of Portugal bowled well. Daia had made a figure of 10–2–35–3. Malta was all out in 187 in 41 overs. Portugal won that match by 110 runs.
In their last match on 21 August 1997 against Austria at the same stadium Portugal batted First like the two other matches. But this match Portugal could make a 240/7. Nazir Usman made the highest run of 45, while lower order batsman Daia and G Ramchande made a 39 and 27. They made 72 runs partnership in the 7th wicket. Austria did well. But they couldn't reached to the destination of 241 in 50 overs. But they made a 214 in 46.1 overs. 1st down Batsman A Simpson-Parker made the highest score of Austria's innings. He scored 55. G Ramchande made 3/41 in 9.1 overs. Portugal won that match by 26 runs.

Portugal was top of the group B with 6 points in 3 matches.

In the semi-final Portugal, Champion of group B, met France the runners up of Group A. But unfortunately Portugal lost that match against France. 
Portugal batted first for a fourth consecutive time. But in the semi-final Portugal's batting line-up was outmatched against the France's bowling. Portugal managed a 156 all out in 40.4 overs. Nadeem Butt scored 33 runs which was the highest runs of Portugal's innings. France made 157 very easily in 45.3 overs with 7 wickets in hand. Number 3 batsman N Jones made a 60.

Because of the unexpected defeat against France, Portugal was knocked out from the semi-final of The European Nations Cup 1997.

2018-Present
In April 2018, the ICC decided to grant full Twenty20 International (T20I) status to all its members. Therefore, all Twenty20 matches played between Portugal and other ICC members after 1 January 2019 will be a full T20I. 

Portugal played their first T20I on 25 October 2019, against Spain, during the 2019 Iberia Cup.

Tournament history

European Championship 

1996: Did not participate
1998: Did not qualify
2000: 4th place (Division Two)
2002: 3rd place (Division Two)
2004: Did not qualify
2006: Did not qualify

European Affiliates Championship 

1999: Runner-up
2001: Champion
2003: 5th place
2005: 5th place
2007: 5th place
2009: 6th place

Domestic cricket 
The only league in Portuguese cricket for the last decade has been the Lisbon league, which has been played by a varying number of local clubs (between three and seven) depending on the economic activity in the area. Most recently the National League has been contested by Lisbon-based teams and two new clubs – one from the Algarve and one from Almoster. There are four registered clubs – Asian CC, Oeiras CC, Comunidade Hindu Portuguesa CC (CHP), and Friends CC in the Lisbon area, with a club in Oporto (Oporto Cricket and Lawn Tennis Club), a club in the Algarve (Barrington's CC) and one from Almoster (Presban CC). Over the years the Asian CC has dominated the league.

Records and Statistics 

International Match Summary — Portugal
 
Last updated 4 July 2022

Twenty20 International 

 Highest team total: 218/6 v Gibraltar on 22 August 2021 at Gucherre Cricket Ground, Albergaria.
 Highest individual score: 100, Azhar Andani v Gibraltar on 21 August 2021 at Gucherre Cricket Ground, Albergaria.
 Best individual bowling figures: 4/25, Syed Maisam Ali v Belgium on 2 July 2022 at Royal Brussels Cricket Club, Waterloo.

T20I record versus other nations

Records complete to T20I #1611. Last updated 4 July 2021.

See also
 List of Portugal Twenty20 International cricketers
 Portuguese Cricket Federation

References

External links 
Official Site
Matches played by Portugal  at CricketArchive

Cricket in Portugal
National cricket teams
Cricket
Portugal in international cricket